

The Washington National Guard Museum, also known as The Arsenal Museum, is a military museum of the Washington National Guard.  It is located at the Washington National Guard headquarters at Camp Murray, visible from Interstate 5 near Lakewood, Washington.

The museum is run by Washington National Guard State Historical Society volunteers.

Collection
The collection includes (inside) military artifacts and memorabilia including National Guard weapons, uniforms and diaries, and outside, static displays including an M47 Patton tank, F-101 Voodoo jet fighter, and AH-1 Cobra attack helicopter.

The Arsenal

The building housing the museum, The Arsenal, was built in 1915–1916. It predates the nearby Lewis Army Museum, just as the National Guard's Camp Murray is a generation older than the adjacent and larger Fort Lewis (now Joint Base Lewis-McChord).

References

Further reading

External links

Museums in Pierce County, Washington
Military and war museums in Washington (state)
Government buildings completed in 1916
National Guard (United States) museums